The Madagascar commemorative medal was a French commemorative medal issued to the participants to the First Madagascar expedition in 1883, and the Second Madagascar expedition in 1894–95. Two different medals were issued, the first one by the law of 31 July 1886, the second one by the law of 15 January 1896.

Notes

Military awards and decorations of France
Awards established in 1883
Awards established in 1886
French Madagascar
French campaign medals
Malagasy awards
Madagascar expeditions